Carry-le-Rouet or simply Carry is a commune in the Bouches-du-Rhône department in the Provence-Alpes-Côte d'Azur region in Southern France. In 2019, it had a population of 5,690. It is part of the Aix-Marseille-Provence Metropolis.

Every February, Les Oursinades festival takes place, celebrating the consumption of sea urchins, various shellfish and other seafood.

Transport
Carry-le-Rouet is served by the Carry-le-Rouet TER PACA railway station (opened in 1915) on the Miramas–L'Estaque railway.

Demographics

Personalities
Comic actor Fernandel, who built his family's house above the beach in the 1930s.
The singer Nina Simone, who lived out the last years of her life in Carry-le-Rouet and died at her home in 2003.

Sister cities
  Dietmannsried, Bavaria, Germany
  Busseto, Emilia-Romagna, Italy

See also
Communes of the Bouches-du-Rhône department

References

External links
 Official website 

Communes of Bouches-du-Rhône
Bouches-du-Rhône communes articles needing translation from French Wikipedia